Passionate Friends are a rock band from Scotland, popular during the 1980s, who reformed in 2008.

Career
Passionate Friends, a Glasgow-based five-piece band was formed in 1982 and became one of the most exciting acts of that era, supporting Rod Stewart, The Police, Big Country and Nik Kershaw. Following a long period of inactivity the band reformed in 2008. Its music is a fusion of rock and pop, both foot-tapping and thought-provoking. In 1982, the band performed at venues around Scotland and had an opening slot on the bill at the 2008 Retrofest festival at Strathclyde Park. In 2009, the band provided support to The Blow Monkeys and Hue and Cry. A CD, Stealing Seconds, was released to coincide with the band's re-launch.

In 1982, the line-up consisted of the brothers John McNeill (guitar and vocals), Malky McNeill (keyboard and vocals), Allan McNeill (bass guitar and vocals), and Davey Halley (drums). This was augmented later in the year by lead guitarist Tam Watson, and his cousin Michael Quinn on saxophone.

In November 1982, in Glasgow's Park Lane studios, they recorded three songs, two of which formed their double "A" side first single, "Time Bandits" and "What's the Odds", on their own Tenement Toons label. Following its release, on 11 March 1983, it received overwhelming support from Radio Clyde, having been played on almost every programme, but especially by Richard Park (now with Magic 105.4 in London and the infamous headmaster of BBC's prime time show Fame Academy), Mark Goodier (now morning host on 102.2 Smooth Radio in London) and Billy Sloan. The single was picked up nationally and was played on the Radio One John Peel, David Jensen, Peter Powell and Adrian John shows. The single was reviewed favourably by Elvis Costello on Radio Clyde.

Following the success of "Time Bandits", the band's home base became Night Moves in Sauchiehall Street, Glasgow, where they performed a regular Sunday night sell-out show, with the DJ, Richard Park.

In summer 1983, following a series of gigs around the country, the band came to the attention of Harvey Goldsmith, who appeared in his own TV series called Get Your Act Together on the Channel 4. Goldsmith was promoting the Rod Stewart gig at Ibrox Stadium in Glasgow, and invited the band to play support to Rod, Gary Glitter and Jo Boxers. Billy Connolly, also managed by Goldsmith, became a fan and was a regular source of advice and encouragement to the band.

Fueled by the success of this gig, the band signed to MCA Records and MCA Music Publishing as well as Goldsmith. In October 1983, another single, "Passionate Friends", was recorded at Battery Studios in London, produced by Charlie Eyre. The single reached number 28 in the Radio Clyde charts.

Extensive touring to promote the single followed, notably on the Police Synchronicity tour, in Cornwall and the NEC, Birmingham, a Hogmanay extravaganza with Big Country and RunRig at Glasgow Barrowlands, broadcast live across Europe for MTV, and two support gigs with Nik Kershaw at Derby and Edinburgh. They appeared in a schools television programme, Time to Think, and performed live on the BBC's Untied Shoelaces Show, with the Radio Clyde DJ, Tiger Tim. Radio broadcasts included a live concert on Radio Clyde from Glasgow's NiteMoves.

In spring 1984, the band commissioned the New York producer Jimmy Douglass (recently working with Justin Timberlake and Nelly Furtado). The outcome of these Jam studio sessions in London was three songs "White Boys making White Noise", "End in Tears" and "Hostage".

Not long after this the band ended its association with MCA Records and its management. It split up in 1984. After a long spell of inactivity, although the various members continued their own projects, the Friends were back together again for a series of gigs in summer 2008.

In December 2017, drummer Davie Halley died.

Discography

Albums
2008 Stealing Seconds  four track CD Tenement Toons TEN12
2006 Kilt By Death: The Sound Of Old Scotland - various artists
2008 EDGAR - Edinburgh University Rock Society Freshers CD - various artists

Singles
1982 "Time Bandits" Tenement Toons TEN02
1983 "Passionate Friends" MCA Records MCA842

Digital downloads
2008 "Stealing Seconds"
2018 "White Boys / End in Tears"

Collaborations
1984 The London Heritage Original Soundtrack (London Tourist Board Video) - Passionate Friends compositions: Heritage and Skyline.

Television appearances
1983 Untied Shoelaces Show - BBC
1983 Time to Think - schools television

Concert appearances
1983 "Rod Stewart at Ibrox Park, Glasgow"
1983 "The Police Synchronicity Tour, St Austell, NEC Birmingham"
1983 "Big Country Hogmanay show at Barrowlands, Glasgow"
1984 "Nik Kershaw at Derby and Edinburgh Playhouse"
2008 "Retrofest, Strathclyde Park"
2009 "The Blow Monkeys, King Tuts, Glasgow"

Publications
2006 Big Noise: The Sound of Scotland by Martin Kielty

References

External links
 Fanmail Site
 The Zips
 Swing Guitars

Scottish rock music groups
Musical groups from Glasgow
Scottish indie rock groups
British synth-pop groups